Seda River is a river in Latvia. The river is 62 km long. The river flows into Burtnieks Lake.

Historians suggest that in the Middle Ages, the Säde River was the borderline between Estonia and Latvia.

References

Rivers of Latvia